The Chang Hwa Bank Headquarters and Museum is the headquarters office of Chang Hwa Bank and museum located in Central District, Taichung, Taiwan.

History
The building was constructed during the Japanese rule of Taiwan.

Architecture
The building was built with Greek and Roman style. The ground floor serves as the headquarters office of Chang Hwa Bank and the upper floor serves as the bank museum.

Transportation
The building is located a short distance northwest of Taiwan Railways' Taichung Station.

See also
 List of museums in Taiwan

References

Buildings and structures in Taichung
Museums in Taichung
Bank headquarters in Taiwan